Jennifer Anne Elisabeth (Jenny) Rowley (born 1961) is an Anglican priest.

Rowley was educated at Lady Margaret Hall, Oxford. After  curacies in Kingsthorpe and Kettering she was Priest in charge at Nettleham. She was Rector of Selsdon, and Area Dean of Addington, from 2015 until her appointment as an Archdeacon.

Notes

1961 births
Alumni of Lady Margaret Hall, Oxford
Archdeacons of the Isle of Wight
Archdeacons of Portsdown
Living people